is a Japanese ice hockey player. He competed in the men's tournaments at the 1972 Winter Olympics and the 1976 Winter Olympics.

References

1945 births
Living people
Japanese ice hockey players
Olympic ice hockey players of Japan
Ice hockey players at the 1972 Winter Olympics
Ice hockey players at the 1976 Winter Olympics
Sportspeople from Hokkaido